The Class and Nachod Brewery, is located in Philadelphia, Pennsylvania. The house was built in 1911 and was added to the National Register of Historic Places on July 31, 2003.

See also
National Register of Historic Places listings in North Philadelphia
List of defunct breweries in the United States

References

Industrial buildings and structures on the National Register of Historic Places in Philadelphia
Beaux-Arts architecture in Pennsylvania
Industrial buildings completed in 1911
Templetown, Philadelphia
1911 establishments in Pennsylvania
Defunct brewery companies of the United States